Witt is a surname.  People with this surname include: 
 Alex Witt (born 1961), American news anchor 
 Alexander Witt (born 1952), Chilean-American filmmaker
 Alicia Witt (born 1975), American actress
 Bob Witt, vaudeville performer and the "Witt" in the group Witt and Berg
 Bobby Witt Jr. (born 2000), American baseball player
 Bobby Witt Sr. (born 1964), American baseball player, father of Bobby Jr.
 Brendan Witt (born 1975), American football player
 Carl Gustav Witt (1866–1946), German astronomer
 Christian Friedrich Witt (1660s–1717), German baroque composer
 Ernst Witt (1911–1991), German mathematician
 Franz Xaver Witt (1834 – 1888), German composer of Cecilian music
 Friedrich Witt (1770–1836), German composer (not to be confused with Christian Friedrich above)
 Fritz Witt (1908–1944), German Waffen-SS general
 George Witt (baseball) (1933–2013), American baseball player
 George Witt (collector) (1804–1869), doctor, banker and mayor known for his collection of erotic objects
 George Witt (politician) (1863–1925), American politician in the state of Washington
 Holly Witt, American model and actress
 Howard Witt (?–2017), American actor
 James Lee Witt (born 1944), American director of FEMA
 Joachim Witt (born 1949), German musician
 Josef Witt (1901–1994), Austrian operatic tenor
 Katarina Witt (born 1965), German figure skater
 Liza Witt, Australian singer and actress
 Louie Steven Witt, witness to the Kennedy assassination, known as Umbrella man
 Marcos Witt (born 1962), American Christian composer
 Michael Witt (born 1984), Australian rugby league player
 Mike Witt (born 1960), American baseball player 
 Nathan Witt (1903–1982), American labor lawyer
 Otto Witt (1875–1923), Swedish author
 Paul Junger Witt (born 1943), American film and television producer
 Robert Witt (disambiguation), several people
 Roz Witt, American television and film actress
 Sam Witt (born 1970), American poet
 Ulrich Witt (born 1946), German economist
 Uwe Witt (born 1959), German politician
 Vicki Witt, American model
 Wastl Witt (1882–1955), German actor
 Whitey Witt (1895–1988), American baseball player

Surnames from nicknames